Sierra Vista Municipal Airport , a joint-use civil-military airport which shares facilities with Libby Army Airfield, is located on Fort Huachuca in Sierra Vista, a city and U.S. Army installation in Cochise County, Arizona, United States. The airport has three runways and one helipad. It is mostly used for military aviation for the surrounding military base.

As per Federal Aviation Administration records, the airport had 1,304 passenger boardings (enplanements) in calendar year 2005 and 2,041 enplanements in 2006.  According to the FAA's National Plan of Integrated Airport Systems for 2007–2011, Sierra Vista is a general aviation airport (the commercial service category requires at least 2,500 passenger boardings per year).

Historical airline service 
The airport has seen scheduled commercial service to Tucson and Phoenix by at least ten commuter air carriers from the 1960s through 2007:

 Apache Airlines in the 1960s
 America West Airlines in the 1990s.
 Cochise Airlines in the 1970s
 Copper State Airlines 1980-1982
 Golden Airways 1981-1983
 Sierra Vista Aviation 1983-1987
 Golden Pacific Airlines 1987
 StatesWest Airlines 1989–1991. From mid-1990 through 1991 StatesWest operated as USAir Express on behalf of USAir.
 Mesa Airlines 1989–2002. From late 1992 through late 2002 Mesa operated as America West Express on behalf of America West Airlines.
 National Aircompany 2003-2004
 Great Lakes Airlines 2005–2007

The airport has not seen commercial service since Great Lakes Airlines ended on February 28, 2007.

Facilities and aircraft
Sierra Vista Municipal/Libby Army Airfield has three runways and one helipad:

 Runway 8/26: 12,001 x 150 ft (3,658 x 46 m), surface: concrete
 Runway 12/30: 5,366 x 100 ft (1,636 x 30 m), surface: asphalt/concrete
 Runway 3/21: 4,285 x 75 ft (1,306 x 23 m), surface: asphalt/concrete
 Helipad H1: 40 x 40 ft (12 x 12 m), surface: asphalt

For the 12-month period ending December 31, 2006, the airport had 157,184 aircraft operations, an average of 430 per day: 74% military, 24% general aviation, 1% scheduled commercial and <1% air taxi. There are 118 aircraft based at this airport: 59% single engine, 24% military, 7% multi engine, 7% helicopters and 3% ultralights.

Cargo airline

Accidents and incidents 
On January 1, 2015, a Cochise County Sheriff's Office helicopter crashed 20 miles north of the airport while returning to it after having maintenance work performed at the Phoenix area. Pilot and former police officer Jeff Steele and mechanic Marc Hansen, a pilot himself, were both killed.

References

External links 
 Sierra Vista Municipal Airport at City of Sierra Vista website
 Sierra Vista Municipal Airport (FHU) at Arizona DOT airport directory
 Libby Army Airfield at GlobalSecurity.org
 Sierra Vista Aero Association
 
 

Airports in Cochise County, Arizona
Sierra Vista, Arizona